Presidential elections were held for the first time in Niger on 30 September 1965. The country had been declared a one-party state shortly after independence in 1960, with the Nigerien Progressive Party – African Democratic Rally becoming the sole legal party. Its leader, incumbent president Hamani Diori, was the only candidate, and was re-elected unopposed. Voter turnout was reported to be 98.4%.

Results

References

Niger
1965 in Niger
Presidential elections in Niger
One-party elections
Single-candidate elections